The men's team competition at the 2014 European Judo Championships was held on 27 April at the Sud de France Arena in Montpellier, France.

Results

Repechage

References

External links
 

Mteam
EU 2014
European Men's Team Judo Championships